Nikola Kovačević (born 22 April 1993) is a Serbian football forward.

References

External links
 
 Nikola Kovačević stats at utakmica.rs 
 

1993 births
Living people
People from Vranje
Association football forwards
Serbian footballers
FK Jagodina players
FK Radnik Surdulica players
Serbian SuperLiga players
Serbian expatriate footballers
Serbian expatriate sportspeople in Moldova
Expatriate footballers in Moldova
FC Zimbru Chișinău players
FC Costuleni players